1912 was the 23rd season of County Championship cricket in England. The much-criticised Triangular Tournament of Test Matches was held between England, Australia and South Africa. The contest was affected by one of the wettest summers on record and was never repeated. England retained the Ashes, having defeated Australia in one Test.

Honours
County Championship - Yorkshire
Minor Counties Championship - in abeyance
Wisden (special commemoration) - John Wisden

Test series

England won one of its matches against weakened Australia 1–0 with two drawn.  Against South Africa, England won all three matches. Despite the loss of several key players, Australia beat South Africa 2–0 with one match drawn.

County Championship

Leading batsmen
C B Fry topped the averages with 1592 runs @ 56.85

Leading bowlers
Sydney Barnes topped the averages with 69 wickets @ 11.33

References

Annual reviews
 Wisden Cricketers' Almanack 1912

External links
 CricketArchive – season summaries

1912 in English cricket
English cricket seasons in the 20th century